Chionodes soella is a moth of the family Gelechiidae. It is found in Russia (Transbaikal, Ural and Altai Mountains). The habitat consists of taiga forests.

The larvae possibly feed on Larix sibirica.

References

Moths described in 1995
Chionodes
Moths of Asia